Kevin Charles Finlayson (born 7 December 1979 in Glasgow) is a Scottish former footballer that is assistant manager for Kirkintilloch Rob Roy.

Throughout his career he played for five clubs in the Scottish Football League, before turning Junior in 2011 and having a two-year spell in the US with Kitsap Pumas between 2014 and 2016.

Career

Finlayson started his career at Queen's Park where he progressed from the Boys club through to become a regular in the first team playing over 50 games before turning professional with Ross County.

Only playing about a dozen games with the Staggies, Finlayson was loaned back to Queen's Park before re-signing for them permanently in 2000.

After leaving the Spiders, he signed for Stranraer where he played well over 100 times as a right Winger/forward.

After helping Stranraer to promotion at the expense of Greenock Morton, he signed for the Cappielow club on a Bosman free transfer on 31 May 2005, signing along with 3 others (Andy McLaren, Derek Lilley and Alex Walker).

Finlayson became a very adaptable player playing at right back, right wing back, right midfield, centre midfield, left midfield and up front in his five years at Cappielow.

He was released by Morton at the end of the 2009–10 season, and subsequently signed for Clyde. He made 35 appearances in all competitions for the Bully Wee, before leaving the club in May 2011, after turning down a new contract.

Honours

Greenock Morton
 Scottish Second Division: 2006–07

Stranraer
 Scottish Third Division: 2003–04

Queen's Park
 Scottish Third Division: 1999–2000

Kirkintilloch Rob Roy
 Central Sectional League Cup: 2016-17

External links

See also
2008–09 Greenock Morton F.C. season | 2009–10

References

Living people
Footballers from Glasgow
1979 births
Scottish footballers
Queen's Park F.C. players
Ross County F.C. players
Stranraer F.C. players
Greenock Morton F.C. players
Clyde F.C. players
Association football wingers
Association football fullbacks
Scottish Football League players
Scottish Junior Football Association players
Kirkintilloch Rob Roy F.C. players
Kitsap Pumas players
Scottish expatriate sportspeople in the United States
Expatriate soccer players in the United States
Scottish expatriate footballers